Venustoma harucoa is a species of sea snail, a marine gastropod mollusk in the family Mangeliidae.

Description
The length of the shell varies between 5 mm and 8 mm.

Distribution
This marine species occurs off Japan and the Philippines

References

 Bartsch, Paul, The Nomenclatorial Status of Certain Northern Turritid Mollusks; Proceedings of the Biological Society of Washington vol. 54, 1941

External links
 
 

harucoa
Gastropods described in 1941